Iwase (written: 岩瀬 lit. "rock shoal") is a Japanese surname. Notable people with the surname include:

, Japanese footballer
 Hitoki Iwase (born 1974), baseball player
 Ken Iwase (born 1975), football player
 Randy Iwase (born 1947), politician

Japanese-language surnames